Today and Tomorrow is a 2003 Argentine drama film directed by Alejandro Chomski. It was screened in the Un Certain Regard section at the 2003 Cannes Film Festival.

Cast
 Antonella Costa as Paula
 Carlos Lipsic
 Romina Ricci
 Horacio Acosta
 Ricardo Merkin
 Francisco Nápoli
 Sebastian Rotstein as Barman
 Sergio Álvarez
 Carlos Durañona
 Víctor Hugo Carrizo
 Leonora Balcarce
 Violeta Naón
 Manuel Navarro
 Marina Tamar
 Fabian Mell

References

External links

2003 films
2000s Spanish-language films
2003 drama films
Films directed by Alejandro Chomski
Argentine drama films
2000s Argentine films